The Massey family is a Canadian family with Methodist roots that has been prominent since the mid-19th century, known for manufacturing farm equipment and for being patrons of the arts in Canada. The family's manufacturing company, later known as Massey Ferguson, provided the Masseys with their significant fortune. Subsequent generations of Masseys have risen to prominence in the arts, philanthropy and governance. The Massey name remains visible through institutions such as Massey Hall, Massey College and the Massey Lectures.

History 

The Masseys had been in North America since the 17th century, when Jeffrey Massey (1591–1676) migrated from England to the Massachusetts colony in the 1630s to work as a surveyor. The Masseys continued to live in Massachusetts for several generations and fought in the American Revolutionary War. During the first decade of the 19th century, Daniel Massey (1766–1832) and his wife, Rebecca Kelley (1765–1838), moved their family to Haldimand Township in Upper Canada to farm.

In 1847, their son Daniel Massey, Jr. (1798–1856) established the Newcastle Foundry and Machine Manufactory in what is now Newcastle, Ontario. The enterprise was subsequently renamed as the Massey Manufacturing Co. and, in 1879, moved to Toronto, Ontario.

In 1891, the Massey Manufacturing Co. merged with A. Harris, Son and Company to form Massey-Harris, which became the largest agricultural equipment maker in the British Empire. The company eventually became Massey-Harris-Ferguson as a result of a 1953 merger with the Ferguson Company, a British agricultural machinery firm. The company's name was shortened to Massey Ferguson in 1958. After running into financial difficulties during the 1980s, the company closed its Toronto operations in the 1990s. By 2000, the company became part of the American conglomerate AGCO, which continues the Massey Ferguson brand of farm equipment today.

In 1894, Hart Massey built Massey Hall, a performing arts theatre in Toronto, in memory of his late son, Charles Albert Massey (1848–1884), who loved music.

On 8 February 1915, Charles' son, Charles Albert "Bert" Massey II (1880–1915), was shot to death by Carrie Davies (–1961), his 18-year-old British maid, sparking a trial of the century in Canada. Davies, who was ultimately found not guilty, claimed that she shot Bert because she was afraid that he wanted to sexually assault her.

In 1918, the family incorporated the Massey Foundation, which was responsible for the construction of various Toronto landmarks and was the first trust of its kind in Canada. In 1919, Vincent Massey, an alumnus and benefactor of the University of Toronto, initiated and financed at the university one of the earliest student centres in North America, naming it Hart House after his grandfather.

In 1952, Vincent would be sworn in as Governor General of Canada.

In 1962, the Massey Foundation established, built, and partially endowed Massey College, a graduate residential college at the University of Toronto.

In 1975, Massey Hall was municipally designated as a historic site under the Ontario Heritage Act. On 15 June 1981, Massey Hall was designated a National Historic Site of Canada. Starting in July 2018, Massey Hall underwent a two-year restoration project to restore and renew both the interior and exterior of the building, improve patron amenities and accessibility, open two new music venues, and enable the return of the building's original stained glass windows from 1894.

In 1978, the family was the subject of a two-part CBC TV documentary, The Masseys: Chronicles of a Canadian Family, produced by Vincent Tovell, a grandson of Walter Massey, with music by Louis Applebaum.

Family tree 

Daniel Massey (1798–1856) ⚭ Lucena Bradley (1803–1872)
Elvira Deborah Massey ⚭ Orrin Wentworth Powell (1820–1904)
Albert Massey (1822–1849)
Hart Almerrin Massey (1823–1896) ⚭ Eliza Ann Phelps (1823–1908)
Charles Albert Massey (1848–1884) ⚭ Jessie Fremont Arnold (1853–1894)
Eugene A. Massey (1871-1871)
Arthur Lyman Massey (1874–1936) ⚭ Mary Ethel Bonnell (1875–1951)
Arnold Bonnell Massey (1897–1984) ⚭ Dorothy Dewey (1898–1983)
Dorothy Bonnell Massey (1904–1984) ⚭ Stanford Elmore Dack (1891–1977)
Charles Albert Massey (1880–1915) ⚭ Frances Rhoda Vandegrift (1880–1957)
Charles Albert Massey (1900–1975) ⚭ Audrey Eileen Hewitt (1898–1995)
Chester Daniel Massey (1850–1926) ⚭ Anna Dobbins Vincent (1860–1903)
Charles Vincent Massey (1887–1967) ⚭ Alice Stuart Parkin (1879–1950)
Lionel Chester Hart Massey (1916–1965) ⚭ Lilias Evva Ahearn (1918–1998)
Hart Parkin Vincent Massey II (1918–1996) ⚭ Melodie Frances Willis-O'Connor (1923–2016)
Raymond Massey (1896–1983) ⚭ Margery Hilda Fremantle (1900–1989) [div. 1929]; ⚭ Adrianne Allen (1907–1993) [div. 1939]
Geoffrey Massey (1924–2020) ⚭ Ruth Maud Killam (1928–2018)
Raymond Massey
Vincent Massey
Nathaniel Massey
Eliza Massey
Daniel Massey (1933–1998) ⚭ Adrienne Corri (1931–2016) [div. 1967]; ⚭ Penelope Wilton (1946–) [div. 1984]
Alice Massey
Anna Massey (1937–2011) ⚭ Jeremy Brett (1933–1995)
David Raymond William Huggins (1959–)
George Wentworth Massey (1853–1854)
Lillian Frances Massey (1854–1915) ⚭ John Mill Treble (1846–1909)
Charles Edward Treble (1876–1919) ⚭ Violet Patterson (1876–1923)
Lillian Marian Treble (1908–1930)
Marjorie Violet Treble (1909–1983)
Dorothy Elizabeth Treble (1911–2001) ⚭ Donald S. Umphrey (1910–1980)
Laura L. Treble (1918–1994)
Ethel May Treble (1878–1946) ⚭ Frank Louis Barber (1877–1945)
Walter Edward Hart Massey (1864–1901) ⚭ Susan Marie Denton (1863–1938)
Ruth Lillian Massey (1889–1961) ⚭ Harold Thomas Murchison Tovell (1889–1961)
Walter Massey Tovell (1916–2005) ⚭ Anita Faessler (1916–1975)
Harold Murchison Massey Tovell (1919–2001) ⚭ Elizabeth Davidson (1921–1995)
Harold Murchison Tovell (1952–1973)
Craig Massey Tovell (1955–1977)
Madeline Massey (1896–1965) ⚭ James Edward Reid Knox (1890–1971)
James Edward Massey Knox (1921–2006) ⚭ Rosemary Savary (1923–2017)
Dorothy Massey (1898–1972) ⚭ Arthur Melville Goulding (1889–1969)
Helen Goulding (1917–1997) ⚭ ? Lloyd
Ann Goulding (1919–2007) ⚭ Frederick E. Coombs (–1976)
Denton Massey (1900–1984) ⚭ Esther Jeralds (1900–1984)
Elizabeth Massey (1923–2013) ⚭ Louis Paul Breithaupt (1922–2005)
Walter Edward Hart Massey (1928–2014)
Frederick Victor Massey (1867–1890)
Eliza Jane Massey (1829–1888) ⚭ Elias R. Ferguson (1830–1888)
Clarence H Ferguson (1854–1888) ⚭ Minerva A. Male (1854–1895)
Edwin Arthur Ferguson (1862–1932) ⚭ Mary Conant (1868–1934)
Willie W. Ferguson (1874–1874)
Frances Massey (1835–1880) ⚭ William Taylor Boate (1825–1865)
Mary Rosalie Boate (1859-1862)
Ida Emma Boate (1861–1927) ⚭ John Carrick (1852–1928)
William Massey Boate (1862-1862)
Jonathan Benjamin Massey (1836–1837)
Alida Massey (1847–1896)

Legacy 
The following are some of the various structures and other entities in Canada named in honour of members of the Massey family.

Buildings/venues:
Fred Victor Centre — named in honour of Frederick Victor Massey (1867-1890).
Hart House at the University of Toronto — named in honour of Hart Massey (1823–1896) by his grandson, Vincent Massey (1887–1967), 18th Governor General of Canada, who was an alumnus and benefactor of the university.
Hart House Theatre 
Lillian Massey Building — named in honour of Lillian Massey Treble (1854–1915). It was built between 1908 and 1912 for the University of Toronto's Household Science program created by Lillian. It presently houses the offices of the University's Division of University Advancement, Department of Classics and Centre for Medieval Studies, as well as the Toronto flagship store of Club Monaco. 
Massey Centre for Women (originally called the Fred Victor Mission in 1900 then The Victor Home for Women in 1904) — in honour of Hart Massey’s youngest child, Frederick Victor Massey (1867–1890), after his brother Chester Daniel Massey donated a parsonage. In 1989, it was incorporated as the Massey Centre for Women.
Massey Hall — a performing arts theatre funded by Hart Massey in 1894 to honour the memory of his late son, Charles Albert Massey (1848-1884), who loved music.
 Massey Library at Royal Military College of Canada—named after Vincent Massey.

Locations:

 Massey Drive — a town in Newfoundland and Labrador
 Vincent Massey Park — a park in Ottawa, Ontario
 Massey Place — a neighbourhood in Saskatoon, Saskatchewan

Organizations and other:

Massey Commission
Massey Ferguson — agricultural equipment manufacturer
Massey Foundation
Massey Medal

Schools:

 Vincent Massey High School, in Brandon, Manitoba
 Vincent Massey Collegiate, in Winnipeg, Manitoba
 Vincent Massey Collegiate Institute, a former school in Etobicoke, Ontario
 Vincent Massey Public School, in Ottawa, Ontario
 Massey College at the University of Toronto — founded by Vincent Massey. The Massey Foundation, of which Vincent served as a trustee, provided the financial endowment to build the college in 1962.
Massey Lectures
 Vincent Massey Secondary School, in Windsor, Ontario
 Vincent Massey Collegiate, in Montreal, Quebec
 Vincent Massey Public School, in Saskatoon, Saskatchewan

See also
 Massey Foundation
 Massey Lectures
 Massey Medal

References

Further reading

External links
Massey Family archival papers held at the University of Toronto Archives and Records Management Services

 
Canadian families
Canadian socialites
Canadian Methodists